Clay Township is one of the twenty-two townships of Knox County, Ohio, United States.  The 2010 census found 1,604 people in the township, 1,367 of whom lived in the unincorporated portions of the township.

Geography
Located in the southeastern part of the county, it borders the following townships:
Harrison Township - north
Butler Township - northeast corner
Jackson Township - east
Fallsbury Township, Licking County - southeast corner
Eden Township, Licking County - south
Washington Township, Licking County - southwest
Morgan Township - west
Pleasant Township - northwest corner

The village of Martinsburg is located in western Clay Township, and the unincorporated community of Bladensburg lies on the eastern border with Jackson Township.

Name and history
Clay Township was organized in 1825. It is named for Henry Clay, senator from Kentucky.

It is one of nine Clay Townships statewide.

Government
The township is governed by a three-member board of trustees, who are elected in November of odd-numbered years to a four-year term beginning on the following January 1. Two are elected in the year after the presidential election and one is elected in the year before it. There is also an elected township fiscal officer, who serves a four-year term beginning on April 1 of the year after the election, which is held in November of the year before the presidential election. Vacancies in the fiscal officership or on the board of trustees are filled by the remaining trustees.

References

External links
County website

Townships in Knox County, Ohio
Townships in Ohio